This is a list of Royal Navy ship names starting with M and N.

M

 
 
 
 M13
 M14
 M15
 M16
 M17
 M18
 M19
 M20
 M21
 M22
 M23
 M24
 M25
 M26
 M27
 M28
 M29
 M30
 M31
 M32
 M33
 MI
 MII
 MIII
 MIV
 MV
 MVI
 MVII
 MVIII
 MTB102
 MV1
 MV2
 MV3
 MV4
 MV5
 MV6
 MV7
 MV8
 MV9
 MV10
 MV11
 MV12
 MV13
 MV14
 MV15
 MV16
 MV17
 MV18
 MV19
 MV20
 MV21
 MV22
 Macassa
 Macduff
 Macedonian
 Machine
 Mackay
 Mackerel
 Madagascar
 Maddiston
 Madras

 Maeander
 Maenad
 Maesterland
 Magdala
 Magdalen
 Magic
 Magician
 Magicienne
 Magnanime
 Magnet
 Magnificent
 Magpie
 Mahonesa
 Mahratta
 Maida
 Maiden Castle
 Maidstone
 Majestic
 Makassar

 Malabar
 Malacca
 Malaga Merchant
 Malaya
 Malcolm
 Malham
 Malice
 Mallard
 Malling Castle
 Mallow
 Malmesbury Castle
 Maloja
 Malplaquet
 
 Malvern
 Mamaduke
 Mameluke
 Manchester
 
 Mandate
 Mandrake
 Manela
 Manica
 Manilla
 Manly
 Manners
 Mansfield
 Mantis
 Manxman
 Maori
 Maplin
 Marathon
 Marazion
 Marengo
 Margaret
 Margate
 Margett
 Marguerite
 Maria de Loreto
 Maria Prize
 Maria Sancta
 Maria Sandwich
 Maria Spayne
 Maria
 Mariana
 Marianne
 Marie Antoinette
 Marigold
 Mariner
 Marjoram
 Marksman
 Marlborough
 Marlingford
 Marlion
 Marlow
 Marmion
 Marne
 Maroon
 Marquise de Seignelay
 Mars
 Marshal Ney
 Marshal Soult
 
 Marston Moor
 Martah & Mary
 Martial
 Martin Garcia
 Martin
 Marvel
 
 Mary & John
 Mary Ann
 Mary Antrim
 Mary Breton
 Mary Flyboat
 Mary Fortune
 Mary Galley
 Mary George
 Mary Gloria
 Mary Grace
 Mary Guildford
 Mary Hamboro

 Mary Hampton
 Mary Imperial
 Mary James

 Mary Norwell
 Mary Odierne
 Mary of Rouen
 Mary Prize
 Mary Rose
 Mary Thomas
 Mary Willoughby
 Maryanee
 Maryborough
 Maryport
 Maryton
 Mashona
 Mason
 Mastiff
 Matabele
 Matane
 Matapan
 Matchless
 Mathias
 Matilda
 Matthew
 Mauritius
 Mavourneen
 Mawdelyn
 Maxton
 May Frere
 Mayflower
 Mayfly
 Mayford
 Mazurka
 Meadowsweet
 Mecklenburgh
 Meda
 Medea
 Medee
 Mediator
 Medina
 Mediterranean
 Medora
 Medusa
 Medway
 Medway II
 Medway Prize
 Meeanne
 Megaera
 Miermen
 Melampe
 Melampus
 
 Meleager
 Melita
 Melpomene
 Melton
 Melville
 Memnon
 Menace
 Menai
 Mendip
 Menelaus
 
 Mentor
 Meon
 Mercure
 
 Mercury
 Meredith
 Merhonour
 Merlin
 Mermaid
 Merope
 Merry Hampton
 Mersey
 Mersham
 Messenger
 Messina
 Meteor
 Meteorite
 Meynell
 Michael
 Mickleham
 Middlesbrough
 Middleton
 Midge
 Mignonette
 Mignonne
 Milan
 Milbrook
 Mileham
 Milfoil
 Milford
 Milne
 Mimi
 Mimico
 Mimosa
 Minas
 Minden
 Mindful
 Minehead
 Miner I
 Miner II
 Miner III
 Miner IV
 Miner V
 Miner VI
 Miner VII
 Miner VIII
 Minerva
 Minerve
 Mingan
 Minion
 Minnikin
 Minorca
 Minoru
 Minos
 Minotaur
 Minstrel
 Minto
 Minuet
 Minx
 Miramichi
 Miranda
 Mischief
 
 
 Mistletoe
 Mistley
 Mistral
 Mitchell
 Moa
 Modbury
 Moderate
 Modeste
 Mohawk
 Moira
 Monaghan
 Monarca
 Monarch
 
 
 
 
 Mondovi
 Mongoose
 Monitor
 Monkey
 Monkshood
 Monkton
 Monmouth Castle
 Monmouth
 Monow
 Monowai
 Mons
 Monsieur
 Mont Blanc
 Montagu
 Montbretia
 Montego Bay
 Montford
 Montgomery
 Montreal
 Montrose
 Montserrat
 Mooltan
 Moon
 Moorhen
 Moorsom
 Moray Firth
 Mordaunt
 Morecambe Bay
 Moresby
 Morgiana
 Morne Fortunee
 Morning Star
 Moro
 Morpeth Castle
 Morris Dance
 Morris
 Mortar
 
 Moselle
 Moslem
 Mosquito
 
 Moth
 
 Mounsey
 Mount Edgcumbe
 Mounts Bay
 Mourne
 Moy
 Moyola
 Mulette
 Mulgrave
 
 Mull of Galloway
 Mull of Kintyre
 Mull of Oa
 Mullett
 Mullion Cove
 Mullion
 Munlochy
 Munster
 Muros
 Murray
 Musette
 Musk
 Muskerry
 Musket
 Musketeer
 
 Musquito
 Mustico
 Mutine
 Myngs
 Myosotis
 Myrmidon
 Myrtle
 Mystic

N

 N1
 Naas
 Nabob
 Nadder
 Nadur
 Naiad
 Nailsea
 Nairana
 Namur
 Nancy
 Nankin
 Nantwich
 Napier
 Narbada
 Narbrough
 Narcissus
 Narvik
 Narwhal
 Naseby
 Nassau
 Nasturtium
 Natal
 Nathaniell
 Nautilus
 Navarino
 Navy Board
 Navy Transport
 Navy
 
 Nearque
 Necker
 Ned Elvin
 Negresse
 Negro
 Nelson
 Nemesis
 Nene
 Nepal
 
 Nepean
 Nepeta
 Neptune
 Nerbudda
 Nereide
 Nereus
 Nerissa
 Nesbitt
 Ness
 Nessus
 Nestor
 Netley
 Nettle
 Nettlham
 New Adventure
 New Betsey
 New Zealand
 Newark
 Newash
 Newbark
 Newbury
 Newcastle
 Newfoundland
 Newhaven
 Newmarket
 Newport
 Newquay
 Newton
 Neza
 Niagara
 Nicator
 Nicholas Reede
 Nicholas
 Nicodemus
 Niement
 Nieuport
 Nigella
 Niger
 Nigeria
 Nighthawk
 Nightingale
 Nijaden
 Nilam
 Nile
 Nimble
 Nimrod
 Niobe
 Nipigon
 Nisus
 Nith
 Nitrocris
 Nizam
 Noble
 Nomad
 Nonpareil
 Nonsuch
 Noranda
 
 Norfolk
 Norge
 Norham Castle
 Norman
 Norseman
 Norsyd
 
 
 
 
 
 
 
 
 
 
 
 
 
 
 
 Nottingham Prize
 Nova Scotia
 Nox
 Nubian
 Nuestra Senora del Rosario
 Nugent
 Nunney Castle
 Nurton
 Nusa
 Nyaden
 Nyasaland
 Nymph
 Nymphe
 Nymphen

See also
 List of aircraft carriers of the Royal Navy
 List of amphibious warfare ships of the Royal Navy
 List of battlecruisers of the Royal Navy
 List of pre-dreadnought battleships of the Royal Navy
 List of dreadnought battleships of the Royal Navy
 List of cruiser classes of the Royal Navy
 List of destroyer classes of the Royal Navy
 List of patrol vessels of the Royal Navy
 List of frigate classes of the Royal Navy
 List of mine countermeasure vessels of the Royal Navy (includes minesweepers and mine hunters)
 List of monitors of the Royal Navy
 List of Royal Fleet Auxiliary ship names
 List of Royal Navy shore establishments
 List of submarines of the Royal Navy
 List of survey vessels of the Royal Navy

References
 

 M
Names M
Royal Navy M
Royal Navy ships M